China competed at the 2019 Winter Deaflympics held between 12 and 21 December 2019 in Sondrio Province in Northern Italy. The country finished in 6th place in the medal table with a total of two gold medals and two bronze medals.

Medalists

Cross-country skiing 

Zhang Buchi and Wang Liguo won the bronze medal in the team sprint freestyle event.

Curling 

Both the men's event and women's event were won by China.

Snowboarding 

Zhao Yueyue won the bronze medal in the women's parallel slalom event.

References 

Winter Deaflympics
Nations at the 2019 Winter Deaflympics